The Eureka PROMETHEUS Project (PROgraMme for a European Traffic of Highest Efficiency and Unprecedented Safety, 1987–1995) was the largest R&D project ever in the field of driverless cars. It received  in funding from the EUREKA member states, and defined the state of the art of autonomous vehicles. Numerous universities and car manufacturers participated in this Pan-European project.

In formulating the project,  the automotive and industrial partners recognised the need for a wide range of skills and cooperated with over forty research establishments to create a programme consisting of seven sub-projects.  Under a steering committee were three projects on industrial research and four on basic research.

Industrial research
 PRO-CAR : Driver assistance by computer systems
 PRO-NET : Vehicle-to-vehicle communication
 PRO-ROAD : Vehicle-to-environment communication

Basic Research
 PRO-ART : Methods and systems of artificial intelligence
 PRO-CHIP: Custom hardware for intelligent processing in vehicles
 PRO-COM : Methods and standards for communication
 PRO-GEN : Traffic scenario for new assessment and introduction of new systems

In 1987, some UK Universities expressed concern that the industrial focus on the project neglected import traffic safety issues such as pedestrian protection.  PRO-GEN project leader, the UK Government's Transport and Road Research Laboratory noted that research activities should 'in some way, further the aims of the vehicle companies.

Results 
The project culminated in a 'Board Members Meeting' (BMM) on 18–20 October 1994 in Paris.  Projects demonstrated ('Common European Demonstrators') were:

CED 1 : Vision Enhancement

CED 2-1 : Friction Monitoring and Vehicle Dynamics

CED 2-2 : Lane Keeping Support

CED 2-3 : Visibility Range Monitoring

CED 2-4 : Driver Status Monitoring

CED 3 : Collision Avoidance

CED 4 : Cooperative Driving

CED 5 : Autonomous Intelligent Cruise Control

CED 6 : Automatic Emergency Call

CED 7 : Fleet Management

CED 9 : Dual Mode Route Guidance

CED 10: Travel and Traffic Information Systems

PROMETHEUS PRO-ART profited from the participation of Ernst Dickmanns, the 1980s pioneer of driverless cars, and his team at Bundeswehr Universität München, collaborating with Daimler-Benz. They demonstrated autonomous driving in free lanes, convoy driving, automatic tracking of other vehicles, and lane changes left and right with autonomous passing of other cars.

Participants 

 Ernst Dickmanns and team of Bundeswehr University of Munich
 RWTH-Aachen University http://www.rwth-aachen.de/go/id/a/?
 Robert Bosch - Blaupunkt https://www.bosch.de/
 Daimler-Benz
 Renault
 Jaguar Cars
 Fiat
 Opel
 PSA
 Porsche
 BMW
 Volvo
 Volkswagen
 HELLA
 Siemens
 Numerous others (to be completed)

See also 

 Driverless car
 DARPA Grand Challenge
 ARGO Project on autonomous cars
 ELROB trials
 Grand Cooperative Driving Challenge 2011, International Competition

Notes 

Self-driving cars
Eureka (organisation)
Robotics competitions